Adriano Belli (born August 25, 1977) is a retired football player who played in the CFL and NFL. Belli is nicknamed "The Kissing Bandit" for his penchant for kissing people on their cheeks. He has gained a reputation for being a kind and funny man off the field and a nasty and annoying player to his opponents on the field.

Belli grew up in the High Park region of Toronto and attended Humberside Collegiate Institute for the first three years of high school.  He then elected to transfer to Central Technical School in the Harbord Village area of Toronto and commuted by subway to take advantage of Central Tech's football program.  He credits his high school coach, Chuck Wakefield, for helping him get a scholarship to the University of Houston.

On February 19, 2007 The Toronto Argonauts signed Belli.

After the last game of the 2009 season, Belli charged into the Montreal Alouettes locker room and challenged the entire team to a fight.

Belli retired on May 11, 2011, on a Tall ship in Toronto and became a colour commentator/sportscaster on Rogers Sportsnet as their CFL Analyst.

During his retirement, Belli competed for Team Canada when they participated in the 2011 IFAF World Championship in Austria. The team went on to win the Silver medal.

On October 17, 2012, Belli came out of retirement and was signed by the Toronto Argonauts. He went on to win the 100th Grey Cup with the Argos, a game in which he was ejected. Belli officially retired from the CFL for the second time on May 29, 2013.

Belli also runs a meat distribution and packing company with his family in Mississauga, Ontario.

References

External links
 Toronto Argonauts profile
 "Argonauts sign Adriano Belli" (Canadian Press article)
 Belli Fitting in Along Argos' Trenches (National Post article)
 Kissing Bandit shows the love (Hamilton Spectator article on Belli)

1977 births
American football defensive linemen
BC Lions players
Canadian expatriate American football people in the United States
Canadian football defensive linemen
Canadian sportspeople of Italian descent
Gridiron football people from Ontario 
Hamilton Tiger-Cats players
Houston Cougars football players
Las Vegas Outlaws (XFL) players
Living people
Montreal Alouettes players
Players of Canadian football from Ontario
Sportspeople from Toronto
Canadian football people from Toronto
Toronto Argonauts players
University of Houston alumni
Canadian players of American football